Wallagonia micropogon is a species of catfish in the genus Wallagonia. This species was recently discovered  and is found in the Mekong River drainage area between southern Vietnam and northern Laos as well as Chao Phraya River in Thailand. It is a freshwater fish.

Until osteological research validated the genus Wallagonia in 2014, W. micropogon was included in the genus Wallago.

References

Siluridae
Catfish of Asia
Fish of the Mekong Basin
Fish of Cambodia
Fish of Laos
Fish of Thailand
Fish of Vietnam
Fish described in 2004
Taxobox binomials not recognized by IUCN